Debu Bose was an Indian actor born in Odisha, British India. Bose made his debut in the film Tapasya in 1980. The actor has acted in over 120 movies within his career, spanning over four decades.

Early life
He was born on 2 December 1942 at Odisha during the British Raj. When he was pursuing his college degree in Berhampur, he was a member of Ganjam Kala Parishad. During this period, he had participated in several dance dramas. He had been interested in dance, so Bose took classical dance training under legendary Odissi dancer Kelucharan Mohapatra.

Career
Bose started his career as a dancer and assistant choreographer in Mana Akasha, directed by Nitai Palit in 1974.
He had been known for works in films like Samay Kheluchhi Chaka Bhaunri, Ki Heba Sua Posile, Pua Moro Kala Thakura, Phula Chandana, Kaberi, Sahari Bagha and Suna Chadhei. His last film was Raasta, which released in 2014.
Bose had been associated with regional theatre group Diganta, he had also directed several plays.

Death
While undergoing treatment, Bose died due to cardiac arrest at a private hospital in Hyderabad on 22 August 2018. This was not the first time he felt illness, he had suffered cardiac arrest on two occasions in the past. 
The Ollywood movie fraternity had expressed its deep condolence in his death and dubbed it as an irreparable loss.

References

External links
 

1942 births
2018 deaths
Indian male film actors